Illinois Route 99 is a north–south state route in western Illinois. It runs from Illinois Route 104 across the Illinois River and Meredosia, north to Illinois Route 101 in Brooklyn (Schuyler County).

Route description 
Illinois 99 runs northwest from Meredosia to Mount Sterling. It enters the Mount Sterling area on Pittsfield Road north of Illinois Route 107. It then overlaps U.S. Route 24 and runs west on Main Street. After about a half mile (.8 km), Illinois 99 then turns north on Cross Street, west on Washington Street, and then back north on Camden Road en route to Camden.  Illinois 99 continues north (staying west of the LaMoine River) to Illinois 101 at Brooklyn, its northern termination.

History 
SBI Route 99 had been a route from West Point to Tennessee on local roads, IL 91, IL 61, and US 136. In 1935, IL 99 was dropped from those routes. In 1937, it replaced IL 104 on its current route;  in March 1941, it was announced that IL 99 was extended north to Brooklyn.

Major intersections

References

External links

099
Transportation in Pike County, Illinois
Transportation in Brown County, Illinois
Transportation in Schuyler County, Illinois